Punahou Circle apartments is a 12-story apartment building at 1617 S. Beretania Street in the Makiki neighborhood of Honolulu, Hawaii. The building was one of the childhood homes of Barack Obama, the 44th President of the United States. Obama lived in the building from 1971 to 1979, when he graduated from high school.  It was built in 1965. The building is being considered for landmark status. Obama's maternal grandmother lived in the family apartment until her death in 2008.

References

Apartment buildings in Hawaii
Residential buildings in Hawaii
Buildings and structures in Honolulu
Barack Obama
Presidential homes in the United States